Karıncalı may refer to places in Turkey:

Places
  - a village in Kırşehir district of Kırşehir Province
 Karıncalı, Bayramiç - a village in Bayramiç district of Çanakkale Province
 Karıncalı, Serik - a town in Serik district of Antalya Province
  - a village in Malazgirt district of Muş Province
 Karıncalı, Orhaneli - a town in Orhaneli district of Bursa Province